Gilbert Heathcote may refer to:

 Sir Gilbert Heathcote, 1st Baronet (1652–1733), British politician, Member of Parliament (MP) for London, St Germans and others
 Sir Gilbert Heathcote, 3rd Baronet (died 1785), British politician, MP for Shaftesbury
 Sir Gilbert Heathcote, 4th Baronet (1773–1851), British politician, MP for Rutland and others
 Gilbert Heathcote (Royal Navy officer) (1779–1831), British naval officer
 Gilbert Heathcote, 1st Baron Aveland (1795–1867), MP for Boston, South Lincolnshire and Rutland
 Gilbert Heathcote (priest) (1775–1829), Archdeacon of Winchester
 Sir Gilbert Simon Heathcote, 9th Baronet (1913–2014), successor of Heathcote baronets of London from 1983 to 2014

See also 
 Gilbert Heathcote-Drummond-Willoughby, 1st Earl of Ancaster (1830–1910), British politician, MP for Boston
 Gilbert Heathcote-Drummond-Willoughby, 2nd Earl of Ancaster (1867–1951), British politician, MP for Horncastle
 Sir Gilbert James Heathcote-Drummond-Willoughby, 3rd Earl of Ancaster (1907–1983), British soldier & politician MP for Rutland and Stamford
 Gilbert Heathcote's tunnel, an engineering project dating from the 1630s